Iota Carinae (ι Carinae, abbreviated Iota Car, ι Car), officially named Aspidiske , is a star in the southern constellation of Carina. With an apparent visual magnitude of 2.2, it is one of the brighter stars in the night sky.

Appearance and location
The star and rest of southern Carina never sets on places from about 34° S southwards including Cape Town; its northernmost viewpoints are unobstructed southern horizons near to the 30th parallel north, once a day.

The False Cross is an asterism formed from Iota Carinae, Delta Velorum, Kappa Velorum and Epsilon Carinae. It is so called because it is sometimes mistaken for the Southern Cross, causing errors in astronavigation.

The star appears 46.0' (0.7668°) WSW of lowercase a Carinae, a mid-third-magnitude star, also forming part of the asterism and leading to its long, narrow projection which culminates in Canopus.

Nomenclature
ι Carinae (Latinised to Iota Carinae) is the star's Bayer designation.

It has the traditional cognate names Aspidiske (not be confused with Asmidiske, the proper name of Xi Puppis), Scutulum and Turais (or Tureis, a name shared with Rho Puppis). Turais is the Arabic تُرَيْس turais "small shield" (diminutive), while Aspidiske and Scutulum are Greek and Latin translations from ασπίδα and scūtum. In 2016, the International Astronomical Union formed its Working Group on Star Names (WGSN) to catalog and standardize proper names for stars. The WGSN's first bulletin of July 2016 included a table of the first two batches of names it approved which included Aspidiske for this star.

Properties
It has a stellar classification of A9 Ib, with the luminosity class of 'Ib' indicating it has reached the stage of its evolution where it has expanded to become a lower-luminosity supergiant.

Iota Carinae has more than seven times the Sun's mass and has expanded to roughly 43 times the Sun's radius. It is radiating about 4,900 times the luminosity of the Sun. However, this luminosity appears to vary, causing the star's apparent magnitude to range between 2.23–2.28. This energy is being radiated into space from the star's outer envelope at an effective temperature of 7,500 K, giving Iota Carinae the white hue typical of an A-type star.

Due to precession of the Earth's axis of rotation, in the next 7,500 years the south celestial pole will pass close to this star and Upsilon Carinae and it will become the South Star around 8100 CE.

References 

Carinae, Iota
Carina (constellation)
080404
045556
Suspected variables
A-type supergiants
Aspidiske
3699
Durchmusterung objects